Live In Texas: Dead Armadillos is a 1981 live album by the band Trapeze.

Track listing
 "Back Street Love" – 6:55
 "Hold On" – 5:29
 "Midnight Flyer" – 7:33
 "You Are The Music" – 6:01
 "Black Cloud" – 9:05
 "Way Back To The Bone" – 6:58

Trapeze
 Mel Galley - guitars, vocals
 Pete Goalby - lead vocals, guitar
 Pete Wright - bass
 Steve Bray - drums

References

Trapeze (band) albums
1981 live albums